The following lists events that happened during 1925 in the Union of Soviet Socialist Republics.

Incumbents
 General Secretary of the Communist Party of the Soviet Union – Joseph Stalin
 Chairman of the Central Executive Committee of the Congress of Soviets – Mikhail Kalinin
 Chairman of the Council of People's Commissars of the Soviet Union – Alexei Rykov

Events

January
 20 January – The Soviet–Japanese Basic Convention is signed.

December
 18–31 December – 14th Congress of the All-Union Communist Party (Bolsheviks)

Sports
 10 November – 8 December – Moscow 1925 chess tournament

Births
 2 January – Irina Arkhipova, singer
 11 January – Viktor Avdyushko, actor
 15 January – August Englas, Estonian wrestler (d. 2017)
 30 January – Pyotr Kuznetsov, Red Army soldier and Hero of the Soviet Union
 8 March – Efim Geller, chess Grandmaster
 26 June – Pavel Belyayev, cosmonaut
 13 September – Sergei Salnikov, footballer
 20 October – Firudin Shushinski, musicologist
 24 November – Mikhail Khvatkov, Red Army soldier and Hero of the Soviet Union
 12 December - Alexander Khmelik, playwright and director (d. 2001)
 21 December – Tatyana Karakashyants, Olympic diver

See also
 List of Soviet films of 1925
 1925 in fine arts of the Soviet Union

References

 
1920s in the Soviet Union
Years in the Soviet Union
Soviet Union
Soviet Union
Soviet Union